Wayne Township is one of nine townships in Marion County, Indiana. As of the 2010 census, its population was 136,828. The school district is Metropolitan School District of Wayne Township.

Geography

Municipalities 
 Clermont (south half)
 Indianapolis (partial)
 Speedway

Communities 
Eagledale

References

External links

 Indiana Township Association
 United Township Association of Indiana

Townships in Marion County, Indiana
Geography of Indianapolis
Townships in Indiana